Heresy And Creed is the tenth studio album by the melodic hard rock band Ten. The album was released on 26 September 2012 in Japan and on 19 October in Europe. The official release date for North America was 22 October. It is the first album with the new lead guitarist Dan Mitchell, keyboard player Darrel Treece-Birch and drummer Max Yates. Steve Mckenna also returned to the band, making it his first studio appearance for the band since the double compilation album "The Essential Collection 1995-2005" in 2005.

According to Gary Hughes, the new album "Is a particularly strong selection of material. I feel this is possibly our most mature, and diverse collection of songs ever. There is literally something in there for everyone and every taste".

The cover was illustrated by Felipe Machado Franco, known for his work with Blind Guardian.

In October 2012, Heresy And Creed entered the UK Rock Album Charts at number 30.

Track listing
All songs written by Gary Hughes.
 The Gates Of Jerusalem (Instrumental) - 1:34
 Arabian Knights - 6:26
 Gunrunning - 5:52
 The Lights Go Down - 6:12
 Raven’s Eye - 5:43
 Right Now - 5:27
 Game Of Hearts - 4:20
 The Last Time - 6:36
 The Priestess - 5:13
 Insatiable - 4:06
 Another Rainy Day - 4:57
 Unbelievable - 4:07
 The Riddle - 5:32
The Asian version (Avalon Records MICP-11064) adds:
 I Found Love - 3:02

Personnel
Gary Hughes – vocals, guitars, backing vocals
 Dan Mitchell – lead guitars
John Halliwell – rhythm guitars
Darrel Treece-Birch – keyboards, programming
Steve Mckenna – bass guitar
 Max Yates – drums and percussion

Production
Produced by Gary Hughes
Mixing and mastering by Dennis Ward

Concepts
The album's opening tracks, "The Gates Of Jerusalem" and "Arabian Knights", are about the Christian knights who were residing in the Holy Lands and about the Siege of Jerusalem, which took place before the Third Crusade.

Chart positions

References

Ten (band) albums
2012 albums
Frontiers Records albums